Paul Price (born ) was an American professional basketball player. He played in the National Basketball League for the Hammond Ciesar All-Americans in one game during the 1940–41 season and scored six points.

References 

1910s births
Year of birth uncertain
Possibly living people
American men's basketball players
Forwards (basketball)
Hammond Ciesar All-Americans players